Elatine spathulata is a species of flowering plant belonging to the family Elatinaceae.

Its native range is Northern Europe to Germany and Russian Far East.

Synonyms:
 Alsinastrum orthospermum (Düben) Rupr.
 Elatine orthosperma Düben

References

Elatinaceae